Uhunmwonde is one of the Local Government Areas of Edo State, Nigeria. Its headquarters is in the town of Ehor.
 
It has an area of 2,033km and a population of 120,813 at the 2006 census. The villages in Uhunmwonde Local Government Area includes; Obadan, Iguevbiahiamwen, Ogheghe, Igieduma, Ugiamwen, Igueuwangue.

The postal code of the area is 301.

See also
Obadan

References

Evbohuan

Local Government Areas in Edo State